Dayara Bugyal is a Bugyal (Himalayan Alpine Meadow) in the Uttarkashi district of Uttarakhand. Dayara Bugyal is a popular Trekking and Camping Destination. The Bugyal has an average elevation of 3639m and is around 40 km from Uttarkashi. Dayara Bugyal is nestled between the Deodar and Rhododendron trees and is rich in flora and fauna.

Dayara Bugyal is also a destination for trekking as well as camping. In spring, there is contrast of greenery of the grasslands and red and pink rhododendrons. In winters, the Bugyal turns into snow land with capability of skiing and snow activities. The trek is open throughout the year except the monsoon. Views of the Garhwal Himalayas, including Nanda Devi, Bandarpunch and Swargarohini, can be seen from Dayara Bugyal.

Gallery

References 

Montane grasslands and shrublands
Geography of Uttarkashi district
Hiking trails in Uttarakhand